Jurij Viditsch  was a politician of the early 17th century in Slovenia when the country was under the Holy Roman Empire. He became mayor of Ljubljana in 1624. He was succeeded by Horacij Carminelli in 1629.

References

Mayors of places in the Holy Roman Empire
Mayors of Ljubljana
Year of birth missing
Year of death missing
17th-century Slovenian politicians